Mario Barri (born 1928) is a Filipino actor and director.

He appeared in his first movie with Lebran Pictures, called Song of Sto. Tomas.  His second was a biblical picture named Kalbaryo ni Jesus (Passion of Christ).

Barri made his first directorial job in a Fernando Poe production of Multo sa Opera (Ghost in the Opera) in 1954. He is well known for having given Fernando Poe, Jr. his first role in Anak ni Palaris.

He continued to direct into the 1960s.

Filmography
1955 – Anak ni Palaris (Son of Palaris)
1956 – Huk!
1959 – Anak Ng Kidlat (Daughter of Lightning) Tamaraw Studio Pictures
1961 – The Steel Claw 
1962 – Adiong Sikat ng Tondo
1962 – Samar
1962 – Ano Ba Choy
1962 – Out of the Tiger's Mouth
1962 – Kapitan Tornado
1962 – Bilis Sa Bilis
1962 – No Man Is an Island (film)
1962 -- Pagtutuos ng mga Kilabot
1962 – Kababalaghan o kabulastugan?
1962 – Chokaran
1963 – 13 Hudas
1964 – A Yank in Viet-Nam

References

External links

Filipino male film actors
1928 births
Living people
Filipino film directors
20th-century Filipino male actors